The M20 is a motorway in Kent, England. It follows on from the A20 at Swanley, meeting the M25, and continuing on to Folkestone, providing a link to the Channel Tunnel and the ports at Dover. Although not signposted in England, this road is part of the European route E15. It is also used as a holding area for goods traffic when traffic across the English Channel is disrupted, such as Operation Stack and Operation Brock.

Route
The road starts at its junction with the M25 motorway and A20 road just east of Swanley, then continues south east across the River Darent, north of Farningham through the North Downs, past West Kingsdown and Wrotham to meet the M26. It then strikes east, running north of Addington. When it reaches junction 4 it passes south of New Hythe and runs parallel to the Medway Valley railway line before crossing it close to junction 5. This next section is the Maidstone bypass. The High Speed 1 (HS1) railway line then runs parallel to the motorway as it continues to the north of Bearsted, crosses the Swanley to Ashford (via Maidstone East) Line then out into the countryside alongside Leeds Castle. Proceeding south of Lenham and Charing it is crossed by the Ashford and HS1 railway lines before becoming the Ashford bypass.  Travelling past Brabourne Lees it is once again joined by HS1 and the East Stour.

Just north of Saltwood it reaches the Channel Tunnel terminal and is crossed by HS1 for the last time. The final section runs along the northern suburbs of Folkestone.

History

Construction
The M20 was, in common with many United Kingdom motorways, opened in stages:

Junctions 5 to 7 opened in 1960
Junctions 7 to 8 opened in 1961

These sections of the M20 were known as the 'Maidstone Bypass'. This road was then numbered as the A20(M) as it bypassed the stretch of A20 through Maidstone which was renumbered A2020. This was the first stretch of motorway to open south of London. Plans for a bypass of Maidstone had existed since the 1930s, originally as an all-purpose project, before being upgraded to motorway standard in the 1950s. When the motorway was extended westwards towards London in the 1970s, it was renamed M20 and the A2020 reverted to A20.

Junctions 3 to 5 in 1971
Junctions 1 to 2 in 1977
This section ended at a temporary junction near West Kingsdown.
Temporary terminus to junction 3 in 1980
This section of the route was difficult to construct due to its steep descent down the North Downs escarpment.

Sellindge to junction 13 in 1981 – constructed by McAlpines
Junction 9 to Sellindge in 1981 – constructed by Dowsett

The section around Ashford (junctions 9–10) was originally the A20 Ashford Bypass with actual construction having started before World War 2 – although the route itself was not opened until 19 July 1957. The bypass started at Willesborough near the current location of junction 10 and terminated south of the existing junction 9 at the current Drover's Roundabout. A section of the old bypass is still visible now named Simone Weil Avenue. The original bridge that brought Canterbury Road over the bypass is still visible as the bridge was not reconstructed when the motorway was constructed. This section of motorway has no hard shoulder indicating the smaller width of the old bypass.

This left the motorway in two sections, with the  gap running via the A20 – this was referred to locally as 'The Missing Link'. The level of traffic was not considered necessary to complete the route.  Most of the traffic for the Channel ports was using the A2/M2 route. When the Channel Tunnel was ready for construction, it was decided to complete the M20 between junctions 8 and 9 and this opened in 1991.  Concurrent to this was the extension to Dover as part of the A20 which opened in 1993. A new junction 11A was also constructed to serve the Channel Tunnel.

Operation
Following completion of the junction 8 to 9 section, the M20 was 3 lanes either side of the original A20(M) section.  This was a bottleneck, so it was decided to widen this section of motorway.  The road here was increased to a dual 3 or 4 lane road with 2 lane distributor roads either side. This section was opened in 1995.

To the north of Maidstone, there is an overlap between the slip roads for Junctions 5 (A20) and 6 (A229).

Between 2006 and 2007 junction 10 near Ashford was remodelled to increase capacity when the bridges across the motorway were modified to provide three lanes of traffic at the roundabout, and local approach roads were widened, with new traffic lights to control traffic flows at the junction between the A292 Hythe Road and the London-bound M20 entry slip road. A new footbridge was also constructed across the motorway. The cost was £4.9 million.

A Controlled motorway scheme was introduced in West Kent between junctions 4 and 7, with variable speed limits.

In August 2016 part of a pedestrian footbridge connecting areas of Ryarsh divided by the motorway was brought down - initially suspected to be the result of an impact by a digger from nearby works to widen the southbound bridge at junction 4 being carried on a low-loader that was moving along the hard shoulder. In the incident, the southern section of the bridge - which rested on a plinth south of the motorway and the cantilevered northern section - was dislodged and fell onto the carriageway below, landing on the trailer of a passing HGV and being narrowly avoided by a motorcyclist who suffered broken ribs taking avoiding action. Both carriageways of the motorway were closed to enable the removal of the broken section. The motorway reopened with the Highways Agency having declared that the northern part of the bridge was structurally intact. However this section of the motorway was again closed on the weekend of 3 and 4 September 2016 for the demolition and clearance of the northern bridge element. A replacement pedestrian and cycle bridge was opened in March 2021 at a cost of around £1.5 million.

The Highways Agency proposed a new M20 junction 10a and link road to the A2070 at Ashford in Kent, east of junction 10  to support the development of South Ashford which has been identified as a growth area in the South East. In May 2012, it was announced that the scheme would be postponed for the short-term future. Planning recommenced in 2016. Work started on building the scheme in January 2018, with works planned to complete in May 2020. The coast-facing sliproads at the existing Junction 10 were closed to allow the final works on the London-facing sliproads at Junction 10a and the new junction opened on 31 October 2019.

Operation Stack and Operation Brock

Since the opening of the Channel Tunnel, sections of the M20 have been used occasionally for the implementation of Operation Stack, should the ferries and/or Channel Tunnel stop running. This closes that part of the motorway and uses the area as a lorry park until the ferries and/or Channel Tunnel are fully running again.

Operation Brock was the replacement for Stack, to be used in the event of no-deal Brexit.

In July 2020, the government announced that it had bought a site beside junction 10A to build the Sevington customs clearance facility and lorry park.

Junctions

Data from driver location signs are used to provide distance in kilometres and carriageway identifier information. Where a junction spans several hundred metres and start and end points are available, both are cited.

Suicides

There have been two recorded suicides on this road. Philip Mathews, a navy officer, jumped off one of the bridges that go over the M20 in 2018. The same year, another person, Yasmin Howard also jumped off the bridge.

See also
List of motorways in the United Kingdom
Great Britain road numbering scheme
:Category:M20 motorway service stations

References

External links

The Motorway Archive – M20

2-0020
2-0020
Transport in the Borough of Ashford
Transport in Folkestone and Hythe